Rejected Unknown is a 2001 album by acclaimed outsider musician Daniel Johnston. The title references the decision by Atlantic Records to drop him from the label after the commercial failure of his only major-label album, 1994's Fun. Rejected Unknown was produced by Austin producer and former Glass Eye member Brian Beattie. A 7-inch limited edition EP called Dream Scream, featuring that song and "Funeral Girl", was released in 1998 on Pickled Egg Records.

Track listing

References

2001 albums
Daniel Johnston albums